Maveric Lamoureux (born January 13, 2004) is a Canadian junior ice hockey defenceman who currently plays for the Drummondville Voltigeurs of the Quebec Major Junior Hockey League (QMJHL) as a prospect to the Arizona Coyotes of the National Hockey League (NHL). Lamoureux was drafted by the Coyotes in the first round of the 2022 NHL Entry Draft with the 29th pick in the draft. He was signed to a three-year, entry-level contract with the Coyotes on August 17, 2022.

Career statistics

References

External links 

2004 births
Living people
Arizona Coyotes draft picks
Canadian ice hockey defencemen
Drummondville Voltigeurs players
Ice hockey people from Ontario
National Hockey League first-round draft picks
People from Hawkesbury, Ontario